Rudolf Kanzler (born 26 February 1873 in Wasserburg am Inn – died 26 February 1956 in Munich) was a German surveyor and politician who was involved in the organisation of Freikorps units after World War I.

A Roman Catholic, Kanzler was a member of the Centre Party and served this party in the Landtag of Bavaria as representative for Lichtenfels from 1905 to 1918. Noted for his anti-communism, he organised a Bürgerwehr or militia against the communists in Rosenheim in 1919. This group grew into the Freikorps Chiemgau, for a time the largest single Freikorps in Germany, under the command of Kanzler who became known as the 'White General'. Kanzler became an ally of the rightist militant Georg Escherich and soon led his own Organisation Kanzler or 'Orka' in imitation of Escherich's Orgesch. Like his ally he became close to Richard Steidle in Austria and helped him in the organisation of the Heimwehr.

Kanzler stood down from his Freikorps roles in 1921, and later became a member of Carl Spruner von Mertz's Bayerischer Heimat- und Königsbund, a monarchist group that was outlawed in 1933 after the formation of the Nazi Party regime. Indeed, Kanzler had been an early leader of this group, which – beyond a nostalgically sentimental attachment to the House of Wittelsbach – had little function, before giving way to General von Krafft. Kanzler had little in common with the Nazis and was jailed for treason during the Third Reich for attempting to promote monarchism and for co-operating with the Black Front of Otto Strasser. Following his death, on his 83rd birthday, he was buried in his home town of Wasserburg am Inn.

References

1873 births
1956 deaths
People from Wasserburg am Inn
German Roman Catholics
20th-century Freikorps personnel
Centre Party (Germany) politicians
German monarchists
People convicted of treason against Germany
Members of the Bavarian Chamber of Deputies